Shigeki Iwai (born 2 June 1968 in Aichi Prefecture, Japan) is a Japanese politician who has served as a member of the House of Councillors of Japan since 2010. He represents the Shizuoka at-large district and is a member of the Liberal Democratic Party.

He is a member of the following committees (as of 2021):

 Committee on Land and Transport

References 

Members of the House of Councillors (Japan)
Living people
1968 births
Liberal Democratic Party (Japan) politicians
Politicians from Aichi Prefecture
Nagoya University alumni